The Kazakhstan International is an international badminton tournament held in Kazakhstan. This tournament established in 2015 and part of the Badminton World Federation's BWF International Series of Badminton Asia Circuit.

Past winners

Performances by countries

References

External links 
https://bwf.tournamentsoftware.com/sport/winners.aspx?id=F1336869-43B8-4038-B968-036CE3C54575

Badminton tournaments in Kazakhstan
2015 establishments in Kazakhstan